Silver Bay is a city in Lake County, Minnesota, United States. The population was 1,857 at the time of the 2020 census. It is the largest population center in a natural tourism area which includes, Tettegouche State Park and the Split Rock Lighthouse. It is a port along Lake Superior for iron ore and has taconite mining facilities of its own. 

The North Shore National Scenic Drive runs through town.

History
The city of Silver Bay was founded on May 1, 1954 after previously being known as the Beaver Bay housing project. The company town was built to process taconite mined and shipped by train from Babbitt, Minnesota, sixty miles to the northwest.

Silver Bay attained widespread publicity in the 1960s when it was discovered that the Reserve Corporation was dumping taconite tailings into Lake Superior. In 1972 they were forced to stop and charged with violating the Rivers and Harbors Act of 1899, which prohibited the dumping of harmful materials into interstate waters. In 1977, after a long trial, a new waste-storage facility was built 7 miles inland.

Geography

Silver Bay is located 28 miles northeast of Two Harbors, 54 miles northeast of Duluth, and 55 miles southwest of Grand Marais. It is about half way between Duluth and Grand Marais, along the North Shore of Lake Superior.

Tettegouche State Park, the Baptism River, and the Palisade Head rock formation are all nearby.

Summer hiking trails, winter cross country skiing, and maintained snowmobile trails are located within Silver Bay.

Demographics

2010 census

As of the census of 2010, there were 1,887 people, 836 households, and 542 families living in the city. The racial makeup of the city was 97.9% White, 0.2% African American, 0.3% Native American, 0.3% Asian, 0.3% from other races, and 1.0% from two or more races. Hispanic or Latino of any race were 0.9% of the population.

There were 836 households, of which 22.8% had children under the age of 18 living with them, 53.3% were married couples living together, 6.7% had a female householder with no husband present, 4.8% had a male householder with no wife present, and 35.2% were non-families. 31.7% of all households were made up of individuals, and 15.9% had someone living alone who was 65 years of age or older. The average household size was 2.17 and the average family size was 2.69.

The median age in the city was 50.1 years. 18.4% of residents were under the age of 18; 6.9% were between the ages of 18 and 24; 17.4% were from 25 to 44; 28.6% were from 45 to 64; and 28.8% were 65 years of age or older. The gender makeup of the city was 51.8% male and 48.2% female.

2000 census
As of the census of 2000, there were 2,068 people, 844 households, and 589 families living in the city. The racial makeup of the city was 97.68% White, 0.05% African American, 1.11% Native American, 0.15% Asian, 0.05% Pacific Islander, 0.10% from other races, and 0.87% from two or more races. Hispanic or Latino of any race were 0.68% of the population. Germans comprised 22.2% of the population, 18.1% Norwegian, 11.5% Swedish, 6.5% Finnish, 6.4% American, 6.1% Irish, and 5.2% English ancestry.

There were 844 households, out of which 28.2% had children under the age of 18 living with them, 59.8% were married couples living together, 7.1% had a female householder with no husband present, and 30.1% were non-families. Individuals comprised 27.6% of all households, and 14.3% had someone living alone who was 65 years of age or older. The average household size was 2.35 and the average family size was 2.85.

In the city, the population was spread out, with 24.4% under the age of 18, 4.3% from 18 to 24, 23.4% from 25 to 44, 20.8% from 45 to 64, and 27.2% who were 65 years of age or older. The median age was 44 years. For every 100 females, there were 104.8 males. For every 100 females age 18 and over, there were 105.8 males.

The median income for a household in the city was $36,524, and the median income for a family was $41,667. Males had a median income of $40,655 versus $25,809 for females. The per capita income for the city was $16,958. About 5.3% of families and 6.8% of the population were below the poverty line, including 8.5% of those under age 18 and 2.9% of those age 65 or over.

Infrastructure

Transportation
Silver Bay was served by the Silver Bay Municipal Airport until it closed on June 7th, 2018 for an indefinite amount of time.

Outer Drive (County Road 5), Penn Boulevard, and Minnesota Highway 61 are three of the main routes in Silver Bay.

References

External links
 

Cities in Lake County, Minnesota
Cities in Minnesota
Minnesota populated places on Lake Superior